Philolaus (Philólaos) was a Greek Pythagorean and pre-Socratic philosopher. He was born in a Greek colony in Italy and migrated to Greece. Philolaus has been called one of three most prominent figures in the Pythagorean tradition and the most outstanding figure in the Pythagorean school. Pythagoras developed a school of philosophy that was dominated by both mathematics and mysticism. Most of what is known today about the Pythagorean astronomical system is derived from Philolaus's views. He may have been the first to write about Pythagorean doctrine. According to August Böckh (1819), who cites Nicomachus, Philolaus was the successor of Pythagoras.

He argued that at the foundation of everything is the part played by the limiting and limitless, which combine in a harmony. With his assertions that the Earth was not the center of the universe (geocentrism), he is credited with the earliest known discussion of concepts in the development of heliocentrism, the theory that the Earth is not the center of the Universe, but rather that the Sun is. Philolaus discussed a Central Fire as the center of the universe and that spheres (including the Sun) revolved around it.

Biography

Various reports give the birthplace of Philolaus as either Croton, Tarentum, or Metapontum—all part of Magna Graecia (the name of the coastal areas of Southern Italy on the Tarentine Gulf that were colonized extensively by Greek settlers). It is most likely that he came from Croton. He migrated to Greece, perhaps while fleeing the second burning of the Pythagorean meeting-place around 454 BC.

According to Plato's Phaedo, he was the instructor of Simmias and Cebes at Thebes, around the time the Phaedo takes place, in 399 BC. That would make him a contemporary of Socrates, and would agree  with the statement that Philolaus and Democritus were contemporaries.

The writings of much later writers are the sources of further reports about his life. They are scattered and of dubious value in reconstructing his life. Apparently, he lived for some time at Heraclea, where he was the pupil of Aresas (perhaps Oresas), or (as Plutarch calls him) Arcesus. Diogenes Laërtius is the only authority for the claim that shortly after the death of Socrates, Plato traveled to Italy where he met with Philolaus and Eurytus. The pupils of Philolaus were said to have included Xenophilus, Phanto, Echecrates, Diocles, and Polymnastus.

As to his death, Diogenes Laërtius reports a dubious story that Philolaus was put to death at Croton on account of being suspected of wanting to be the tyrant; a story which Diogenes Laërtius even chose to put into verse.

Writings

In one source, Diogenes Laërtius speaks of Philolaus composing one book, but elsewhere he speaks of three books, as do Aulus Gellius and Iamblichus. It might have been one treatise divided into three books. Plato is said to have procured a copy of his book. Later, it was claimed that Plato composed much of his Timaeus based upon the book by Philolaus.

One of the works of Philolaus was called On Nature. It seems to be the same work that Stobaeus calls On the World and from which he has preserved a series of passages. Other writers refer to a work entitled Bacchae, which may have been another name for the same work, and which may originate from Arignote. However, it has been mentioned that Proclus describes the Bacchae as a book for teaching theology by means of mathematics.

According to Charles Peter Mason in Sir William Smith's Dictionary of Greek and Roman Biography and Mythology (1870, p. 305):

Additionally, Charles Peter Mason noted (p. 304):

Historians from the Stanford Encyclopedia of Philosophy, Chapter Philolaus' Book: Genuine Fragments and Testimonia, noted the following:

Cosmology

The book by Philolaus begins with the following:

Robert Scoon explained Philolaus' universe in 1922:

Stobaeus' account
According to Stobaeus, Philolaus did away with the ideas of fixed direction in space and developed one of the first non-geocentric views of the universe and in his new way of thinking, the universe revolved around a hypothetical astronomical object he called the Central Fire.

In Philolaus's system a sphere of the fixed stars, the five planets, the Sun, Moon, and Earth, all moved around a Central Fire. According to Aristotle, writing in Metaphysics, Philolaus added a tenth unseen body, he called Counter-Earth, as without it there would be only nine revolving bodies, and the Pythagorean number theory required a tenth. However, Greek scholar George Burch asserts his belief that Aristotle was lampooning Philolaus's addition.

The system that Philolaus described predated the idea of spheres by hundreds of years, however. Nearly two-thousand years later, Nicolaus Copernicus would mention in De revolutionibus that Philolaus already knew about the Earth's revolution around a central fire.

It has been pointed out, however, that Stobaeus betrays a tendency to confound the dogmas of the early Ionian philosophers, and in his accounts, he occasionally mixes up Platonism with Pythagoreanism.

Philosophy

Philolaus argued at the foundation of everything is the part played by the ideas of limit and the unlimited. One of the first declarations in the work of Philolaus was that all things in the universe result from a combination of the unlimited and the limiting; for if all things had been unlimited, nothing could have been the object of knowledge. Limiters and unlimiteds are combined in a harmony (harmonia):

See also
Alcmaeon of Croton
Apeiron
Nicomachus
Parmenides
Protrepticus (Aristotle)
Pythagoreans

Notes

References

External links

5th-century BC philosophers
Ancient Greek mathematicians
Ancient Greek physicists
Ancient Greek political refugees
Ancient Thebes (Boeotia)
Presocratic philosophers
Pythagoreans
Pythagoreans of Magna Graecia
Ancient Crotonians
470s BC births
380s BC deaths
5th-century BC mathematicians
4th-century BC mathematicians